Acromantis elegans, common name elegant acromantis, is a species of praying mantis native to Nepal.

See also
List of mantis genera and species

References

Elegans
Mantodea of Asia
Endemic fauna of Nepal
Insects of Nepal
Insects described in 1993